The following is an alphabetical list of notable people known to have committed fraud.

A
 Alfredo Sáenz Abad, retired in 2013 as CEO and vice-chairman of the Spanish bank Santander Group; in lower executive position in early 1990s, lied about bank loans so that some customers to the bank went to prison, sentenced to prison years later but managed to get a pardon and kept his job
 Frank Abagnale Jr., American impostor who wrote bad checks in 12 countries until arrested in 1969: falsely represented himself as a qualified member of professions such as airline pilot, doctor, attorney, and teacher; the film Catch Me If You Can is based on his life
 Ramon Olorunwa Abbas, also known as Hushpuppi, Nigerian former Instagram influencer and fraudster and money launderer that operated from Dubai.
 John Bodkin Adams, British doctor and suspected years-long serial killer, but only found guiltyin 1957of forging wills and prescriptions related to over 300 deceased patients
 Eddie Antar, founder of Crazy Eddie; has criminal convictions on 17 counts and about $1 billion worth of civil judgments against him stemming from fraudulent accounting practices at that company
 Ruben Oskar Auervaara, a notorious Finnish conman and thief. He became famous by cheating money from women he met through newspaper announcements, by pretending to intend to marry them. His surname has become a concept in the Finnish language, meaning a deceptive charming trickster.
 Mehmet Aydın, Turkish entrepreneur; scammed 1.1 billion lira from 132 thousand people in a single year and went underground. Searched by Interpol with red notice due to qualified fraud.

B
 Jordan Belfort swindled over $200 million via a penny stock boiler room operation. The Wolf of Wall Street is based on his life and fraudulent activity 
 Horatio Bottomley, newspaper owner and Member of Parliament, convicted of fraudulent conversion.

C
 Melissa Caddick, Australian who ran a Ponzi scheme and thereby defrauded friends and close relatives.
 Cassie Chadwick, pretended to be Andrew Carnegie's illegitimate daughter to get loans
 Charlene Corley, who with her twin sister ran a company which used enormously inflated shipping costs to defraud the United States Department of Defense out of $21.5 million.

D
 Edward Davenport, self-styled as a "Lord"; from 2005 to 2009 was the "ringmaster" of a series of advance-fee fraud schemes for (non-existent) loans that defrauded dozens of individuals out of millions of pounds, while costing his clients further hundreds of millions in losses when they signed development property commitments backed by their anticipated loans
 Tino De Angelis, perpetrator of the 1963 Salad oil scandal, which ultimately caused over $180 million ($ billion today) in losses to 51 corporations.
 Marc Dreier, managing founder of law firm Dreir LLP, a $700 million Ponzi scheme from 2004 to 2008
 Enric Durán, from 2006 to 2008, took out 68 commercial and personal loans from a total of 39 banks in Spain with no guarantees or property as collateral, then gave the €500,000 to various anti-capitalist movements

E
 Bernard Ebbers, founder of WorldCom, which went bankrupt in 2002 having inflated its asset statements by about $11 billion ($ billion today)

F
 Ramón Báez Figueroa, banker from the Dominican Republic and former President of Banco Intercontinental (BANINTER), charged in 2003 and later sentenced to 10 years in prison for a U.S. $2.2 billion fraud case ($ billion today). The BANINTER Crisis was overwhelming for the small Dominican economy, equivalent to two-thirds of its national budget.
 Martin Frankel, American former financier, convicted in 2002 of insurance fraud worth $208 million, racketeering and money laundering

G
 Anthony Gignac, a serial con man and fraudster who falsely took on the identity of Saudi prince Khalid bin Al Saud to entrap victims in investment scams and other schemes, currently serving an 18 year jail sentence

H
 Vladislav Horohorin, indicted in 2009 for fraud activities as a hacker and international credit card trafficker, sentenced in 2013
 Elizabeth Holmes, convicted of 4 counts of felony fraud in January 2022 - three counts of wire fraud, and one of conspiracy to commit wire fraud for misleading investors on the biotech company Theranos, a diagnostics company claiming to be able to perform multianalyte clinical chemistry using unsound liquid handling tech. Company results were manipulated, not transparent, and real patient samples were handled in error.
 Shimon Hayut, international ponzi schemer sentenced in Finland and Israel for fraud, wanted by Norway, Sweden, and the UK. His illegal activities were outlined in the Netflix movie "The Tinder Swindler" in 2022.

I
 Samuel Israel III, former hedge fund manager; ran the fraudulent American Bayou Hedge Fund Group; pled guilty in 2005 of defrauding investors out of $450 million ($ million today)

K
 Dennis Kozlowski, former CEO of Tyco International, convicted in 2005 of fraud and other crimes related to his receipt of $81 million in unauthorized bonuses, the purchase of art for $14.725 million and the payment by Tyco of a $20 million investment banking fee to a former Tyco director.
 Sante Kimes and her son committed numerous frauds, violated anti-slavery laws, and committed murders
 Russel King, convicted fraudster known for his part in the doomed purchase of Notts County Football Club. In 2019 he was there sentenced to six years imprisonment. He was released in 2021.
 Bashar Kiwan, Syrian-French convicted fraudster and mastermind of the Comoros passport sales scandal.
 Konrad Kujau, German fraudster and forger responsible for the "Hitler Diaries"
 Rudy Kurniawan, Indonesian wine fraudster in America

L
 Kenneth Lay, American businessman who built energy company Enron; one of the highest paid CEOs in the U.S. until he was ousted as chairman and convicted of fraud and conspiracy, although, as a result of his death, his conviction was vacated
 Nick Leeson, English trader whose unsupervised speculative trading caused the collapse of Barings Bank
 James Paul Lewis, Jr., ran one of the biggest ($311 million) and longest running Ponzi schemes (20 years) in U.S. history

M
 Gregor MacGregor, Scottish con man; tried to attract investment and settlers for the non-existent country of Poyais
 Bernard Madoff, creator of a $65 billion Ponzi scheme, the largest investor fraud ever attributed to a single individual
 Matt the Knife, American con artist, card cheat and pickpocket; from age approximately 14 through 21, stole from dozens of casinos, corporations and at least one Mafia crime family.
 Billy McFarland organizer of the notorious Fyre Festival and other fraudulent activities in which he defrauded others of $27.4 million
 Gaston Means, professional con man during U.S. President Warren G. Harding's administration
 Harshad Mehta, committed fraud without bank receipts of ₹5 billion from State Bank of India and an individual scam of ₹14 billion using fake bank receipts. The Indian television series Scam 1992 is based on his life and fraudulent activity.
 Trevor Milton, founder and former CEO of Hydrogen Trucking company Nikola inc. Convicted of Fraud lying to investors to pump the companies stock price. 

 Barry Minkow, founder of ZZZZ Best, a carpet-cleaning and restoration company, which was actually a front for a Ponzi scheme.
 Michael Monus, founder of Phar-Mor, which ultimately cost its investors more than $1 billion
 F. Bam Morrison, conned the town of Wetumka, Oklahoma by promoting a circus that never came
 Phillip Musica, engaged in tax fraud, bank fraud, and securities fraud (McKesson & Robbins scandal (1938)).

P
 Lou Pearlman, former boy-band manager and operator of a $300 million Ponzi scheme using two shell companies
 Frederick Emerson Peters, American impersonator who wrote bad checks
 Thomas Petters, American masquerading as a business man who turned out to be a con man; former CEO and chairman of Petters Group Worldwide;  resigned his position as CEO in 2008 amid mounting criminal investigations; later convicted for turning Petters Group Worldwide into a $3.65 billion Ponzi scheme; sentenced to 50 years in federal prison
 Charles Ponzi, Ponzi scheme
 Gert Postel, German mailman; worked as a psychiatrist in different hospitals

R
 Alves Reis, ran the 1925 Portuguese Bank Note Crisis, forging Bank of Portugal documents giving him authority to hire a firm to print moneyofficial banknotes worth 100 million Portuguese escudos (adjusted for inflation, it would be worth about US$150 million today)
 John Rigas, cable television entrepreneur, co-founder of Adelphia Communications Corporation and owner of the Buffalo Sabres hockey team; indicted in 2002 for defrauding the corporation by concealing $2.3 billion in liabilities from corporate investors and of using corporation funds as personal funds, sentenced to a 12-year term in federal prison
 Christopher Rocancourt, a Rockefeller impersonator who defrauded Hollywood celebrities
 Scott W. Rothstein, disbarred lawyer from Ft. Lauderdale, Florida; perpetrated a decades long Ponzi scheme, until caught in 2009, which defrauded investors of over $1 billion

S
 Michael Sabo, best known as a check, stocks and bonds forger; became notorious from the 1960s through to the 1990s as a "Great Impostor" with over 100 aliases, earning millions but also receiving numerous prison terms
 Emil Savundra, Sri Lankan insurance swindler; the collapse of his Fire, Auto & Marine Insurance Company left 400,000 motorists in the UK without coverage.
 Jeffrey Skilling is an American former CEO of Enron Corporation, convicted of  securities fraud (and other crimes) for his part in the 2001 Enron scandal, a $63.4 billion bankruptcy ($ billion today).
 John Spano, struggling businessman who faked massive success in an attempt to buy out the New York Islanders of the NHL in 1996; ran an advance-fee for loans fraud after release from prison, sent to prison again, returned to fraud after serving that sentence, again sent to prison.
 Allen Stanford, self-styled banker; sold fake certificates of deposit to over 30,000 investors in 100 countries, raking in up to $8 billion over 20 years
 John Stonehouse, the last Postmaster General of the UK and MP; faked his death to marry his mistress
 Charles Stopford, assumed the identity of a deceased infant and claimed to be the Earl of Buckingham

T
 Kevin Trudeau, American writer and billiards promoter; convicted of fraud and larceny in 1991; known for a series of late-night infomercials and his series of books about "Natural Cures 'They' Don't Want You to Know About"

W
 Samuel D. Waksal is the founder and former CEO of the biopharmaceutical company ImClone Systems. In October 2002, he pleaded guilty to charges of securities fraud, bank fraud, obstruction of justice, and perjury.
 Ferdinand Ward, financial swindler in the late 1800s
 Dina Wein Reis pled guilty to conspiracy to commit wire fraud in May 2011, having duped corporations out of tens of millions of dollars.
 Richard Whitney, stole from the New York Stock Exchange Gratuity Fund in the 1930s
 Whitaker Wright, company promoter, convicted of fraud.

References

Further reading
 

Fraud
Lists of criminals
People convicted of fraud